Willie McRae (18 May 1923 – 7 April 1985) was a Scottish lawyer, orator, naval officer, politician and anti-nuclear campaigner. In the Second World War he served in the British Army and then the Royal Indian Navy. He supported the Indian independence movement and for much of his life was active in the Scottish National Party (SNP).

McRae is remembered for his mysterious death, in which his car crashed in a remote part of the Scottish Highlands and he was found shot in the head with a revolver. The official verdict was undetermined.

Life
McRae was born in Carron, Falkirk, where his father was an electrician. McRae edited a local newspaper in Grangemouth at the same time as reading history at the University of Glasgow, from which he gained a first-class degree. In the Second World War he was commissioned into the Seaforth Highlanders but transferred to the Royal Indian Navy, in which he became a lieutenant commander and aide-de-camp to Admiral Lord Mountbatten. He supported the Indian independence movement.

After the war McRae returned to the University of Glasgow and graduated again, this time in law. He authored the maritime law of Israel and was an emeritus professor of the University of Haifa. After his death a forest of 3,000 trees was planted in Israel in his memory.

McRae became a solicitor and an SNP activist. In both of the 1974 General Elections and in the 1979 General Election he stood for Parliament as the SNP candidate for Ross and Cromarty. In October 1974 he only lost to the Conservative Hamish Gray by 633 votes, but in 1979 Gray's majority increased to 4,735. In the latter year he also contested the SNP leadership, coming third in a three-way contest with 52 votes to Stephen Maxwell's 117 votes and winner Gordon Wilson's 530 votes.

McRae was a vocal critic of the British nuclear lobby. Early in the 1980s he was a key figure in a campaign against the United Kingdom Atomic Energy Authority plans to dispose of nuclear waste in the Mullwharchar area of the Galloway Hills. Representing the SNP in a public inquiry, McRae asked difficult questions of the UKAEA and famously declared at one meeting that "nuclear waste should be stored where Guy Fawkes put his gunpowder." The authority's plans were rejected, and McRae was credited with "single-handedly" preventing the area from becoming a nuclear waste dump.

Death

On 5 April 1985 McRae left his Glasgow flat at 18:30 to spend the weekend at his cottage at Ardelve near Dornie, Ross-shire. He was not seen again until the next morning around 10:00, when two Australian tourists saw his maroon Volvo saloon car on a moor a short distance from the junction of the A887 and A87 roads Bun Loyne, Glenmoriston, Inverness-shire. The tourists flagged down the next car to pass, whose driver turned out to be a doctor, Dorothy Messer, accompanied by her fiancé as well as David Coutts, an SNP Dundee councillor who knew McRae.

It was discovered that McRae was in the car. His hands were "folded on his lap", his head was "slumped on his right shoulder", and there was a "considerable amount of blood on his temple". He was not wearing a seat belt.

Another car was sent to call the emergency services. Dr Messer examined McRae and found that he was still alive and breathing. She noted that one of his pupils was dilated, indicating the possibility of brain damage, and estimated that he had been in that state for 10 hours.

McRae was removed by ambulance to Raigmore Hospital, Inverness, accompanied by Dr Messer. After admission it was decided to transfer him to Aberdeen Royal Infirmary. At Aberdeen it was realised that the incident was more than a road accident; six hours after he had been found, a nurse washing his head discovered what appeared to be the entry wound of a gunshot. An X-ray confirmed that McRae had been shot above his right ear and a bullet was detected in his head. His brain was severely damaged and his vital functions very weak. The next day, Sunday 7 April, after consultation with his next of kin, McRae's life-support machine was switched off.

Investigation
The investigation was headed by Chief Superintendent Andrew Lister of Northern Constabulary CID. Despite no weapon having yet been found, McRae's car was moved at 12:00 on 7 April. It later transpired that the police had kept no record of the precise location where the car had been found, and the position stated by them was later found to be  in error, and was corrected by a witness who had been present at the scene.

A weapon was found the next day, in the burn over which the car had been discovered,  from the vehicle. It was a Smith & Wesson .22 calibre revolver containing two spent cartridges and five remaining rounds.

Controversy
Although it was ruled at the time by authorities that McRae's death was undetermined, aspects of the investigation remain disputed, some claiming that the distance from McRae's car at which the gun was found and the lack of fingerprints on it rendered a suicide not credible.

At the time of his death, McRae had been working to counter plans to dump nuclear waste from the Dounreay Nuclear Power Development Establishment into the sea. Due to his house being burgled on repeated occasions prior to his death, he had taken to carrying a copy of the documents relating to his Dounreay work with him at all times. They were not found following his death, and the sole other copy which was kept in his office was stolen when it was burgled, no other items being taken.

Neither McRae's medical reports nor the post-mortem data have been released to the public and there was no fatal accident inquiry.

Aftermath
Winnie Ewing – then President of the SNP and herself an accomplished lawyer – was directed by the SNP's National Executive Committee (NEC) to conduct an internal investigation for the party to come to a conclusion as to whether Ewing "was satisfied or dissatisfied with the official version that he committed suicide". Having been refused access to police records of the investigation and rebuffed by both the Lord Advocate and the Procurator Fiscal in her attempts to conduct private, confidential meetings with them, Ewing, as she later wrote, came "up against a brick wall". Ewing reported to the SNP NEC that she was not satisfied with the official account of suicide: "I do not know what happened, but I think it is important that the truth emerges, despite the time that has passed. Why the State refuses to let the truth be known is a pertinent question."

In 1991 Channel 4 broadcast a "Scottish Eye" documentary investigating the mysterious circumstances of McRae's death. It found evidence to suggest that McRae had been under surveillance by UK intelligence services and that his death had likely involved foul play.

In 2005 Winnie Ewing's son Fergus, by then an MSP, requested a meeting with Elish Angiolini, Solicitor General for Scotland, to discuss allegations that have persisted that McRae was under surveillance at the time of his death. The request was rebuffed, with Angiolini claiming that he had not been under surveillance and that she was satisfied that a thorough investigation into the case had been carried out.

In July 2006 a retired police officer, Iain Fraser, who was working as a private investigator at the time of McRae's death, claimed that he had been anonymously employed to keep McRae under surveillance only weeks before he died. In November 2006 an episode of the Scottish Television show Unsolved examined the circumstances of McRae's death.

In November 2010 John Finnie, then SNP group leader on Highland Council and a former police officer, wrote to the Lord Advocate urging her to reinvestigate McRae's death and release any details so far withheld. Finnie's request was prompted by the release the previous month of further details concerning the death of David Kelly. In January 2011 the Crown Office requested the files on the case from Northern Constabulary.

Also in November 2010 Donald Morrison, a former Strathclyde Police officer, alleged that McRae had been "under surveillance" by both Special Branch and MI5. Morrison had collaborated with former colleague Iain Fraser to discover more about McRae's death. Morrison called for an enquiry into McRae's death and promised that he would give it a sworn affidavit that MI5 was involved.

In July 2014 two unconnected plays by George Gunn and Andy Paterson about McRae's life and death, both coincidentally titled 3,000 Trees, were staged at the Edinburgh Festival Fringe. One of the plays explored his anti-nuclear campaigning, links with nationalist radicals and allegations that Special Branch and MI5 were surveilling him.

In November 2014 a Scottish Sunday Express front-page article alleged that McRae had uncovered evidence of the alleged paedophile ring in Westminster during the 1980s. The article suggests he may have been murdered and that the evidence he possessed was stolen at the time of his death.

In April 2015 there was a campaign to have a Fatal Accident Inquiry (FAI) on McRae's death. It attracted 6,500 signatures in 5 days.

The petition eventually collected over 13,000 signatures and was handed in, in June 2015. The Crown Office rejected the proposal to hold a Fatal Accident Inquiry.

On the Easter weekend of April 2015, the 30th anniversary of McRae's death, Scotland on Sunday ran a story claiming that McRae's Volvo was moved back to the crash site by Northern Constabulary in an attempt to hide that the car had been moved before the bullet had been found – accounting for the discrepancies relating to the gun's distance from the car.

On the same day, one of the journalists involved started crowdfunding for a book on the case titled '30 Years of Silence'.

Following the rejection of the petition for a Fatal Accident Inquiry by the Crown Office, a "Justice For Willie" Campaign group was set up by Mark MacNicol. The campaign decided to launch their own investigation since no official inquiry was forthcoming. They hired two private investigators to re-interview original witnesses from the time of Willie McRae's death. The results were published in November 2016, and the campaign were unable to find any new evidence to undermine the official suicide verdict.

In October 2018, fresh doubt on the official verdict was raised again by a nurse who claims to have treated Willie McRae at Foresterhill Hospital in Aberdeen. Katharine Mcgonigal disputed that the bullet wound was to the right temple, as the post-mortem claimed, and said it was instead to the back of the neck.

References

Further reading
 A fictionalised account of events leading up to McRae's death and its aftermath.

External links
  official Northern Constabulary files and photographs
 
 

1923 births
1985 deaths
Scottish anti-nuclear weapons activists
Deaths by firearm in Scotland
Indian independence activists
Scottish National Party parliamentary candidates
Scottish National Party politicians
Scottish solicitors
Academic staff of the University of Haifa
British Army personnel of World War II
Seaforth Highlanders officers
Indian military personnel of World War II
Royal Indian Navy officers
Conspiracy theories in the United Kingdom